Rasha Nasr (born 12 May 1992) is a German politician of the Social Democratic Party. She represents Saxony in the Bundestag.

Early life 
Nasr was born in Dresden to Syrian parents. She studied political science at the TU Dresden.

Political career 
In the 2021 German federal election Nasr stood in the constituency of Dresden I but came in fourth place in candidate votes. She was elected on the state list, becoming the first Saxon MP with an immigrant background. In the negotiations to form a so-called traffic light coalition of the SPD, the Green Party and the Free Democrats (FDP) following the elections, she was part of her party's delegation in the working group on social policy, co-chaired by Dagmar Schmidt, Sven Lehmann and Johannes Vogel.

In parliament, Nasr has since been serving on the Committee on Labour and Social Affairs. In this capacity, she is her parliamentary group’s rapporteur on refugees and migrants. Within her parliamentary group, she is part of working groups on social affairs and migration.

Within her parliamentary group, Nasr belongs to the Parliamentary Left, a left-wing movement.

References 

Living people
1992 births
TU Dresden alumni
Politicians from Dresden
21st-century German women politicians
21st-century Syrian women politicians
21st-century Syrian politicians
Female members of the Bundestag
Members of the Bundestag for Saxony
Members of the Bundestag 2021–2025
Members of the Bundestag for the Social Democratic Party of Germany
German people of Syrian descent